Here is a full taxonomy of the family Euphorbiaceae, according to the most recent molecular research. This complex family previously comprising 5 subfamilies: the Acalyphoideae, the Crotonoideae, the Euphorbioideae, the Phyllanthoideae and the Oldfieldioideae. The 3 first ones are uni-ovulate families while the 2 last one are bi-ovulate.

Now the Euphorbiaceae has been split into 5 families: The 3 uni-ovulate subfamilies have become the Euphorbiaceae in the strict sense, with the tribe Galearieae in the Acalyphoideae forming the most of the family Pandaceae. Part of the bi-ovulate subfamily Phyllanthoideae has become the family Phyllanthaceae, with the tribe Drypeteae as family Putranjivaceae and the tribe Centroplaceae part of the Pandaceae. The other bi-ovulate subfamily Oldfieldioideae has become the Picrodendraceae.

Subfamily Acalyphoideae

Tribe Acalypheae
There are 12 subtribes and 32 genera:

Subtribe Acalyphinae
Acalypha (also Acalyphes, Acalyphopsis, Calyptrospatha, Caturus, Corythea, Cupameni, Galurus, Gymnalypha, Linostachys, Mercuriastrum, Odonteilema, Paracelsea, Ricinocarpus, Schizogyne, Usteria)

Subtribe Adrianinae
Adriana (also Meialisa, Trachycaryon)

Subtribe Claoxylinae
Claoxylon (also Erythrochilus, Erythrochylus)
Claoxylopsis
Discoclaoxylon
Erythrococca (also Athroandra, Autrandra, Chloropatane, Deflersia, Poggeophyton, Rivinoides)
Micrococca

Subtribe Cleidiinae
Cleidion (also Lasiostyles, Psilostachys, Redia, Tetraglossa)
Sampantaea
Wetria (also Pseudotrewia)

Subtribe Dysopsidinae
Dysopsis (also Mirabellia, Molina)

Subtribe Lasiococcinae
Clonostylis
Homonoia (also called Haematospermum, Lumanaja])LasiococcaSpathiostemon (also Polydragma)

Subtribe LobaniliinaeLobaniliaSubtribe MacaranginaeMacaranga (also Adenoceras, Mappa, Mecostylis, Pachystemon, Panopia, Phocea, Tanarius)

Subtribe MareyinaeMareyaMareyopsisSubtribe MercurialinaeMercurialis (also Cynocrambe, Discoplis, Synema)LeidesiaSeideliaSubtribe RicininaeRicinus - castor bean

Subtribe RottlerinaeAvellanitaDeuteromallotusHanceaMallotus (also Aconceveibum, Axenfeldia, Coelodiscus, Diplochlamys, Echinocroton, Echinus, Hancea, Lasipana, Plagianthera, Rottlera,Stylanthus)RockinghamiaTribe Adelieae
There are 6 genera:Adelia (also Ricinella)CrotonogynopsisEnriquebeltrania (also Beltrania)GarciadeliaLasiocrotonLeucocrotonTribe Agrostistachydeae
There are 4 genera:Agrostistachys (also Heterocalyx, Sarcoclinium)Chondrostylis (also Kunstlerodendron)CyttaranthusPseudagrostistachysTribe Alchorneae
There are 2 subtribes and 7 genera:

Subtribe AlchorneinaeAlchornea (also Bleekeria, Cladodes, Hermesia, Lepidoturus, Schousboea, Stipellaria)AparisthmiumAubletianaBocquillonia (also Ramelia)Orfilea (also Diderotia, Laurembergia)

Subtribe ConceveibinaeConceveiba (also Conceveibastrum, Conceveibum, Veconcibea)GavarretiaPolyandraTribe Ampereae
There are 2 genera:Amperea (also Leptomeria)Monotaxis (also Hippocrepandra, Reissipa)

Tribe Bernardieae
There are 6 genera:AdenophaedraAmyreaBernardia (also Alevia, Bernarda, Bernhardia, Bivonia, Passaea, Phaedra, Polyboea, Traganthus, Tyria)DiscocleidionNecepsia (also Neopalissya, Palissya)ParanecepsiaTribe Caryodendreae
There are 3 genera:AlchorneopsisCaryodendron (also Centrodiscus)DiscoglypremnaTribe Chaetocarpeae
This tribe has 2 genera:Chaetocarpus (also Gaedawakka, Mettenia, Neochevaliera, Regnaldia)Trigonopleura (also Peniculifera)

Tribe Cheiloseae
There are 2 genera:CheilosaNeoscortechinia (also Alcineanthus, Scortechinia)

Tribe Chrozophoreae
This tribe has 4 subtribes and 12 genera:

Subtribe ChrozophorinaeChrozophora (also Crossophora, Crozophora, Ricinoides, Tournesol, Tournesolia)

Subtribe DitaxinaeArgythamnia (also Argithamnia, Argothamnia, Argyrothamnia, Argytamnia, Odotalon, Serophyton)Caperonia (also Acanthopyxis, Androphoranthus, Cavanilla, Lepidococea, Meterana)Chiropetalum (also Aonikena, Desfontaena, Desfontaina, Desfontainea)Ditaxis (also Aphora, Paxiuscula, Stenonia)Philyra (also Phyllera)

Subtribe DoryxylinaeDoryxylon (also Mercadoa, Sumbavia)MelanolepisSumbaviopsis (also Adisa, Adisca)ThyrsantheraSubtribe SperanskiinaeSperanskiaTribe Dicoelieae
This tribe has one genus:DicoeliaTribe Epiprineae
There are 2 subtribes and 9 genera:

Subtribe EpiprininaeAdenochlaena (also Niedenzua, Centrostylis)CephalocrotonCephalocrotonopsisCladogynos (also Adenogynum, Baprea, Chloradenia)Cleidiocarpon (also Sinopimelodendron)EpiprinusKoilodepas (also Caelodepas, Calpigyne, Coelodepas, Nephrostylus)

Subtribe CephalomappinaeCephalomappa MuricococcumTribe Erismantheae
There are 3 genera:ErismanthusMoultonianthusSyndyophyllumTribe Omphaleae
This tribe only has 1 genus:Omphalea (also Duchola, Hebecocca, Hecatea, Neomphalea, Omphalandria, Ronnowia)

Tribe Plukenetieae
There are 3 subtribes and 13 genera:

Subtribe DalechampiinaeDalechampia (also Cremophyllum, Dalechampsia, Megalostylis, Rhopalostylis)

Subtribe PlukenetiinaeAngostylis (also Angostyles)AstrococcusHaematostemonPlukenetia (also Accia, Angostylidium, Apopandra, Botryanthe, Ceratococcus, Elaeophora, Eleutherostigma, Fragariopsis, Hedraiostylus, Pseudotragia, Pterococcus, Sajorium, Tetracarpidium or Vigia)Romanoa (also Anabaena, Anabaenella)

Subtribe TragiinaeAcidoton (also Durandeeldia, Gitara)BiaCnesmone (also Cenesmon, Cnesmosa)Megistostigma (also Clavistylus)PachystylidiumPlatygyna (also Acanthocaulon)SphaerostylisTragia (also Agirta, Allosandra, Ctenomeria, Lassia, Leptobotrys, Leptorhachis, Leucandra, Schorigeram, Zuckertia)TragiellaTribe Pycnocomeae
There are 2 subtribes and 7 genera:

Subtribe BlumeodendrinaeBlumeodendronBotryophora (also Botryospora, Botryphora)PodadeniaPtychopyxis (also Clarorivinia)

Subtribe PycnocominaeArgomuellera (also Neopycnocoma, Wetriaria)DrocelonciaPycnocoma (also Comopyena)

Tribe Sphyranthereae
There is only 1 genus:SphyrantheraSubfamily Crotonoideae

Tribe Adenoclineae
There are 2 subtribes and 6 genera:

Subtribe AdenoclininaeAdenocline (also Adenoclina, Diplostylis, Paradenocline)DittaGlycydendronKlaineanthusTetrorchidium (also Hasskarlia, Tetrorchidiopsis)

Subtribe EndosperminaeEndospermum (also Capellenia)

Tribe Aleuritideae
This tribe has 6 subtribes and 14 genera:

Subtribe AleuritinaeAleurites (also Camirium)ReutealisVernicia (also Ambinux, Dryandra, Elaeococca)

Subtribe BenoistiinaeBenoistiaSubtribe CrotonogyninaeCrotonogyne (also Neomanniophyton)CyrtogononeManniophytonSubtribe GarciinaeGarcia (also called Carcia)

Subtribe GrosserinaeCavacoaGrosseraSandwithiaTannodia (also Domohinea)TapoidesSubtribe NeoboutoniinaeNeoboutoniaTribe Codiaeae
There are 15 genera:AcidocrotonBaliospermumBaloghia (also Steigeria)Blachia (also Deonia)Codiaeum (also Crozophyla, Junghuhnia, Phyllaurea, Synaspisma)ColobocarposDimorphocalyxDodecastigmaFontaineaHylandiaOphellanthaOstodesPantadeniaPausandraSagotiaStrophioblachiaTribe Crotoneae
There are 6 genera:AstraeaBrasiliocrotonCroton (also Agelandra, Aldinia, Angelandra, Anisepta, Anisophyllum, Argyra, Argyrodendron, Astraea, Astrogyne, Aubertia, Banalia, Barhamia, Brachystachys, Calypteriopetalon, Cascarilla, Centrandra, Cieca, Cleodora, Codonocalyx, Comatocroton, Crotonanthus, Crotonopsis, Cyclostigma, Decarinium, Drepadenium, Eluteria, Engelmannia, Eremocarpus, Eutrophia, Friesia, Furcaria, Geiseleria, Gynamblosis, Halecus, Hendecandas, Heptallon, Heterochlamys, Heterocroton, Julocroton, Klotzschiphytum, Kurkas, Lasiogyne, Leptemon, Leucadenia, Luntia, Macrocroton, Medea, Merleta, Monguia, Myriogomphus, Ocalia, Oxydectes, Palanostigma, Penteca, Pilinophyton, Piscaria, Pleopadium, Podostachys, Saipania, Schradera, Semilta, Tiglium, Timandra, Tridesmis, Triplandra, Vandera)Mildbraedia (also Neojatropha, Plesiatropha)Moacroton (also Cubacroton)Paracroton (also Desmostemon, Fahrenheitia)

Tribe Elateriospermeae
This tribe only has 1 genus:Elateriospermum (also Elaterioides, Elaterispermum)

Tribe Gelonieae
This tribe has 2 genera:CladogeloniumSuregada (also Ceratophorus, Erythrocarpus, Gelonium, Owataria)

Tribe Jatropheae
There are 8 genera:AnnesijoaDeutzianthusJatropha (also Adenorhopium, Adenoropium, Castiglionia, Collenucia, Curcas, Jatropa, Loureira, Mesandrinia, Mozinna, Zimapania)Joannesia (also Anda, Andicus)LeeuwenbergiaLoerzingiaOligocerasVaupesiaTribe Manihoteae
This tribe has 2 genera:Cnidoscolus (also Bivonea, Jussieuia, Mandioca, Victorinia)Manihot (also Hotnima, Janipha, Manihotoides)

Tribe Micrandreae
There are 2 subtribes and 4 genera:

Subtribe HeveinaeHevea (also Caoutchoua, Micrandra, Siphonanthus, Siphonia)

Subtribe MicrandrinaeCunuriaMicrandra (also Clusiophyllum, Pogonophyllum)MicrandropsisTribe Ricinocarpeae
There are 2 subtribes and 7 genera:

Subtribe BertyinaeBertya (also Lambertya)BorneodendronCocconerionMyricantheSubtribe RicinocarpinaeAlphandiaBeyeria (also Beyeriopsis, Calyptrostigma, Clavipodium)Ricinocarpos (also Echinosphaera, Ricinocarpus, Roeperia)

Tribe Ricinodendreae
There are 3 genera:GivotiaRicinodendronSchinziophytonTribe Trigonostemoneae
There is only 1 genus:Trigonostemon (also Actephilopsis, Athroisma, Enchidium, Kurziodendron, Neotrigonostemon, Nepenthandra, Poilaniella, Prosartema, Silvaea, Telogyne, Tritaxis, Tylosepalum)

Subfamily Euphorbioideae

Tribe Euphorbieae
This tribe has 3 subtribes and 6 genera:

Subtribe AnthosteminaeAnthostemaDichostemmaSubtribe EuphorbiinaeCubanthus (to be transferred to Euphorbia)Euphorbia (also Ademo, Adenopetalum, Adenorima, Agaloma, Aklema, Alectoroctonum, Allobia, Anisophyllum, Anthacantha, Aplarina, Arthrothamnus, Bojeria, Ceraselma, Chamaesyce, Characias, Chylogala, Crepidaria, Ctenadena, Cyathophora, Cystidospermum, Dactylanthes, Dematra, Desmonema, Diadenaria, Dichrophyllum, Dichylium, Diplocyathium, Ditritra, Elaeophorbia, Endadenium, Endoisila, Epurga, Esula, Euforbia, Eumecanthus, Euphorbiastrum, Euphorbiodendron, Euphorbiopsis, Euphorbium, Galarhoeus, Hexadenia, Kanopikon, Kobiosis, Lacanthis, Lathyris, Lepadena, Leptopus, Lophobios, Lortia, Lyciopsis, Medusea, Monadenium, Nisomenes, Ossifraga, Peccana, Pedilanthus, Petalandra, Pleuradena, Poinsettia, Pythius, Sclerocyathium, Stenadenium, Sterigmanthe, Synadenium, Tithymaloides, Tithymalopsis, Tithymalus, Torfasadis, Treisia, Tricherostigma, Trichosterigma, Tumalis, Vallaris, Ventenatia, Xamesike, Zalitea, Zygophyllidium)

Subtribe NeoguillauminiinaeCalycopeplusNeoguillauminiaTribe Hippomaneae
This tribe has 2 subtribes and 33 genera:

Subtribe CarumbiinaeHomalanthus (also Carumbium, Dibrachion, Dibrachium, Duania, Wartmannia)

Subtribe HippomaninaeActinostemon (also Dactylostemon)AdenopeltisAnomostachysBalakataBonania (also Hypocoton)ColliguajaConosapiumDalembertia (also Alcoceria)DendrocousinsiaDendrothrixDitrysiniaDuvigneaudiaExcoecaria (also Commia, Glyphostylus)FalconeriaGrimmeodendronGymnanthes (also Adenogyne, Ateramnus)Hippomane (also Mancanilla, Mancinella)MabeaMaprounea (also Aegopicron, Aegopricon, Aegopricum)MicrostachysNeoshirakia (also Shirakia)PleradenophoraPseudosenefelderaRhodothyrsusSapium (also Carumbium, Gymnobothrys, Sapiopsis, Seborium, Shirakiopsis, Stillingfleetia, Taeniosapium) - Chinese tallowSclerocrotonSebastiania (also Clonostachys, Cnemidostachys, Elachocroton, Gussonia, Microstachys, Sarothrostachys, Tragiopsis)SenefelderaSenefelderopsisShirakiopsisSpegazziniophytumSpirostachysStillingia (also Gymnostillingia)TriadicaTribe Hureae
There are 4 genera:AlgernoniaHuraOphthalmoblaptonTetraplandra (also Dendrobryon)

Tribe Pachystromateae
There is one genus:Pachystroma (also Acantholoma)

Tribe Stomatocalyceae
There are 2 subtribes and 4 genera:

Subtribe HamilcoinaeHamilcoaNealchorneaSubtribe StomatocalycinaePimelodendron (also Stomatocalyx)Plagiostyles''

See also
 Cultivated plant taxonomy
Taxonomy of the Phyllanthaceae
Taxonomy of the Picrodendraceae

References

External links
Taxonomy of the Euphorbiaceae from NPGS/GRIN

Genera
Taxonomic lists (genera)
Lists of plant genera (alphabetic)